U Antliae (U Ant) is a variable star in the constellation Antlia.  It is a carbon star surrounded by two thin shells of dust.

U Antliae is an extremely red C-type carbon star. These cool stars on the asymptotic giant branch are further reddened by strong mass loss and dust that forms around the star. It emits most of its radiation in the infrared and although it is only about 500 times brighter than the sun at visual wavelengths, its bolometric luminosity is 8,000 times higher than the Sun's.

U Antliae is an irregular variable star with an apparent magnitude that varies between 5.27 and 6.04. Approximately 900 light years from Earth, it is surrounded by two shells of dust, thought to have been ejected 14,000 and 10,000 years ago.  The exact origin and structure  of the shells is uncertain, possibly due to enhanced mass loss during thermal pulses, possibly due to interaction of the stellar wind with interstellar material.

References

Slow irregular variables
091793
Antlia
Carbon stars
Antliae, U
051821
4153
Asymptotic-giant-branch stars
Durchmusterung objects